Eastman is a village in Crawford County, Wisconsin, United States. The population was 428 at the 2010 census. The village is located within the Town of Eastman.

Geography
Eastman is located at  (43.163664, -91.019442).

Demographics

2010 census
As of the census of 2010, there were 428 people, 168 households, and 117 families living in the village. The racial makeup of the village was 98.8% White and 1.2% from two or more races.

There were 168 households, of which 32.7% had children under the age of 18 living with them, 58.3% were married couples living together, 8.9% had a female householder with no husband present, 2.4% had a male householder with no wife present, and 30.4% were non-families. 25.6% of all households were made up of individuals, and 11.9% had someone living alone who was 65 years of age or older. The average household size was 2.55 and the average family size was 3.13.

The median age in the village was 37.8 years. 25.9% of residents were under the age of 18; 9.8% were between the ages of 18 and 24; 23.3% were from 25 to 44; 27.2% were from 45 to 64; and 13.6% were 65 years of age or older. The gender makeup of the village was 51.2% male and 48.8% female.

2000 census
As of the census of 2000, there were 437 people, 163 households, and 109 families living in the village. The population density was 122.2 people per square mile (47.1/km2). There were 170 housing units at an average density of 47.5 per square mile (18.3/km2). The racial makeup of the village was 97.25% White, 0.23% Native American, 0.23% Asian, and 2.29% from two or more races. 1.83% of the population were Hispanic or Latino of any race.

There were 163 households, out of which 37.4% had children under the age of 18 living with them, 60.7% were married couples living together, 0.6% had a female householder with no husband present, and 33.1% were non-families. 30.7% of all households were made up of individuals, and 16.6% had someone living alone who was 65 years of age or older. The average household size was 2.68 and the average family size was 3.43.

In the village, the population was spread out, with 31.8% under the age of 18, 8.0% from 18 to 24, 26.5% from 25 to 44, 19.7% from 45 to 64, and 14.0% who were 65 years of age or older. The median age was 34 years. For every 100 females, there were 96.8 males. For every 100 females age 18 and over, there were 98.7 males.

The median income for a household in the village was $32,321, and the median income for a family was $41,250. Males had a median income of $29,583 versus $21,250 for females. The per capita income for the village was $12,922. About 5.7% of families and 10.7% of the population were below the poverty line, including 8.8% of those under age 18 and 20.6% of those age 65 or over.

Notable people
 Barbara Bedford, actress featured in films from 1920 to 1945, was born in Eastman.

References

Villages in Crawford County, Wisconsin
Villages in Wisconsin